Minnesota State Highway 26 (MN 26) is a state highway in southeastern corner of the U.S. state of Minnesota.  At  in length, Highway 26 runs parallel to the Mississippi River and is a portion of the Great River Road.  The route begins at the Iowa state line where it continues as Iowa Highway 26, and ends at an intersection with Minnesota State Highway 16 south of La Crescent.

Route description
State Highway 26 serves as a north–south route in southeast Minnesota between La Crescent, MN and Lansing, IA. The route follows a scenic path along the Mississippi River; as such, it makes up a section of the Great River Road. Highway 26 is nestled between the base of the bluffs and the river channel.

MN 26 begins at the Iowa state line near New Albin, Iowa, where Iowa Highway 26 continues across the border to the south. Immediately upon entering Minnesota, Highway 26 enters the Richard J. Dorer State Forest. Near Reno, the river widens at the pool behind Lock and Dam No. 8.

Highway 26 continues north along the Mississippi River and the Iowa, Chicago and Eastern Railroad line towards Brownsville.  North of Brownsville, Highway 26 begins to turn inland away from the river.  Six miles north of Brownsville, Highway 26 ends at a T intersection with Minnesota State Highway 16, near the Root River and the city of La Crescent.

The highway is defined as Route 198 in the Minnesota Statutes. It is not marked with this number.

History
Highway 26 was authorized April 22, 1933. It originally connected Iowa Highway 182 and U.S. Highway 16. Iowa Highway 182 became Iowa Highway 26 in 1969, and U.S. 16 became Minnesota State Highway 16 in 1980.

The roadway was gravel when marked. It was paved in 1948 except for the section between the bridge crossing Wildcat Creek and the crossing of an unnamed stream two miles to the north. This remaining portion was paved in 1949.

In August 2007, parts of Highway 26 were washed away by flooding or covered by landslides caused by unusually heavy rains. Between  of rain fell over a two-day period.

Major intersections

References

External links

Highway 26 at The Unofficial Minnesota Highways Page

026
Transportation in Houston County, Minnesota
026